Haji Abdul Muis Picho (born 20 July 1957) is a Malaysian politician who served as the Member of the Sabah State Legislative Assembly for Sebatik from 2008 to 2020.

Born in Kampung Bombalai, Tawau in 1957, Muis was educated at SRK Bombalai, SMK Abaka and SMK Holy Trinity. He then studied automotive engineering at Federal Institute of Technology. Following the graduation, he served as the CEO of Manuk Mas Livestock Farm from 1984 to 1993.

Being a member of the United Malays National Organisation (UMNO) since 1990s, he served various positions within the party. He was firstly elected the MLA for Sebatik in 2008 election and was re-elected in 2013 and in 2018. Shortly after his third re-election in 2018, he quit the UMNO and joined the Sabah Heritage Party (WARISAN) in order to let Shafie Apdal to be the new Chief Minister.

On 29 July 2020, it was reported that Muis was one of several WARISAN-PH-UPKO MLAs who backed Musa Aman as the new Chief Minister. Though Musa announced that he had already gained enough supports (33 out of 65) to form a new government, Shafie asked the Yang di-Pertua Negeri to rather dissolve the State Legislative Assembly and call a fresh election. Muis then joined the Malaysian United Indigenous Party (PPBM) and sought for a re-election, but lost to the WARISAN candidate Hassan A. Gani Pg. Amir.

He married Hajjah Hanawiah binti Paressa and has 12 children.

Election results

References 

1957 births
Living people
Malaysian politicians
Former United Malays National Organisation politicians
Malaysian United Indigenous Party politicians